Alberto Moreiras is a Spanish-born academic and cultural theorist who currently works at Texas A&M University. Previously he taught at Duke University and at the Centre for Modern Thought at the University of Aberdeen.

His publications include Tercer espacio, The Exhaustion of Difference, and Línea de sombra.

In critic Juan Poblete's words, Moreiras's work "has been characterized thus far by a strong metacritical component whereby theoretical texts are continuously de/constructed in an investigation of both their epistemological status and their general political potential as interventions in a concrete field of forces."

Notes

References

External links
 home page at the University of Aberdeen

Latin Americanists
Spanish literary critics
Living people
Texas A&M University faculty
Year of birth missing (living people)